This River is a 2016 Canadian short documentary film directed by Katherena Vermette and Erika MacPherson. The film centres on Drag the Red, a volunteer group in Manitoba who search the Red River for the bodies of Missing and Murdered Indigenous Women.

Smith has stated that it was Vermette's North End Love Songs which helped draw her attention to the perspectives of indigenous youth from the North End and the experience of having missing family members.

Principal photography took place August 8 to 16, 2016, with an all-woman crew documenting the work of Drag the Red volunteer Kyle Kematch. The crew spent much of that time filming from a small fleet of donated boats. The director of photographer was Iris Ng, with Anita Lubosh recording sound.

The film received the 2016 Coup de coeur du jury award at Montreal's Terres en vues/Land InSights First Peoples' Festival and had its public premiere in Vermette's hometown of Winnipeg on October 5 at the Winnipeg Art Gallery. At the 5th Canadian Screen Awards in 2017, the film won the Canadian Screen Award for Best Short Documentary Film.

What Brings Us Here
Vermette and producer Alicia Smith also created a related Instagram work, What Brings Us Here, which offers portraits of volunteers behind the community-run Winnipeg search teams the Bear Clan and Drag the Red.

What Brings Us Here features photos by Winnipeg photographers Janine Kropla, Mark Reimer and Karen Asher. The online work combines images of searchers with their statements about why they are continuing to look for loved ones—and answers.

References

External links
This River at NFB.ca
What Brings Us Here

2016 short documentary films
Canadian short documentary films
Documentary films about First Nations
National Film Board of Canada documentaries
National Film Board of Canada short films
Best Short Documentary Film Genie and Canadian Screen Award winners
Métis film
Films shot in Winnipeg
Violence against Indigenous women in Canada
Documentary films about violence against women
Red River of the North
Quebec films
2016 films
Women in Manitoba
Missing and Murdered Indigenous Women and Girls movement
2010s English-language films
2010s Canadian films